The 1958 Coupe de France Final was a football match held at Stade Olympique Yves-du-Manoir, Colombes on 18 May 1958, that saw Stade de Reims defeat Nîmes Olympique 3–1 thanks to goals by René Bliard (2) and Just Fontaine.

Match details

See also
Coupe de France 1957-1958

External links
Coupe de France results at Rec.Sport.Soccer Statistics Foundation
Report on French federation site

Coupe
1958
Coupe De France Final 1958
Coupe De France Final 1958
Sport in Hauts-de-Seine
Coupe De France Final
Coupe De France Final